Sir Cecil Walter Hardy Beaton,  (14 January 1904 – 18 January 1980) was a British fashion, portrait and war photographer, diarist, painter, and interior designer, as well as an Oscar–winning stage and costume designer for films and the theatre.

Early life and education
Beaton was born on 14 January 1904 in Hampstead, north London,  the son of Ernest Walter Hardy Beaton (1867–1936), a prosperous timber merchant, and his wife, Esther "Etty" Sisson (1872–1962).  His grandfather, Walter Hardy Beaton (1841–1904), had founded the family business of "Beaton Brothers Timber Merchants and Agents", and his father followed into the business. Ernest Beaton was an amateur actor and met his wife, Cecil's mother Esther ("Etty"), when playing the lead in a play. She was the daughter of a Cumbrian blacksmith named Joseph Sisson and had come to London to visit her married sister.

Ernest and Etty Beaton had four children – Cecil; two daughters, Nancy Elizabeth Louise Hardy Beaton (1909–99, who married Sir Hugh Smiley) and Barbara Jessica Hardy Beaton (1912–73, known as Baba, who married Alec Hambro); and son Reginald Ernest Hardy Beaton (1905–33).

Cecil Beaton was educated at Heath Mount School (where he was bullied by Evelyn Waugh) and St Cyprian's School, Eastbourne, where his artistic talent was quickly recognised. Both Cyril Connolly and Henry Longhurst report in their autobiographies being overwhelmed by the beauty of Beaton's singing at the St Cyprian's school concerts.

When Beaton was growing up his nanny had a Kodak 3A Camera, a popular model which was renowned for being an ideal piece of equipment to learn on. Beaton's nanny began teaching him the basics of photography and developing film.  He would often get his sisters and mother to sit for him.  When he was sufficiently proficient, he would send the photos off to London society magazines, often writing under a pen name and "recommending" the work of Beaton.

Beaton attended Harrow School, and then, despite having little or no interest in academia, moved on to St John's College, Cambridge, and studied history, art and architecture. Beaton continued his photography, and through his university contacts managed to get a portrait depicting the Duchess of Malfi published in Vogue. It was actually George "Dadie" Rylands – "a slightly out-of-focus snapshot of him as Webster's Duchess of Malfi standing in the sub-aqueous light outside the men's lavatory of the ADC Theatre at Cambridge." Beaton left Cambridge without a degree in 1925.

Career
After a short time in the family timber business, he worked with a cement merchant in Holborn. This resulted in "an orgy of photography at weekends" so he decided to strike out on his own. Under the patronage of Osbert Sitwell he put on his first exhibition in the Cooling Gallery, London. It caused quite a stir.

Believing that he would meet with greater success on the other side of the Atlantic, he left for New York and slowly built up a reputation there. By the time he left, he had "a contract with Condé Nast Publications to take photographs exclusively for them for several thousand pounds a year for several years to come."

From 1930 to 1945, Beaton leased Ashcombe House in Wiltshire, where he entertained many notable figures.

Here he transformed the interior, adding rooms on the eastern side, extending the parlour southwards, and introducing many new fittings. Greta Garbo was a visitor. He remained at the house until his death in 1980 and is buried in the parish church graveyard.

Photography

Beaton designed book jackets (see Catherine Ives), and costumes for charity matinees, learning the craft of photography at the studio of Paul Tanqueray, until Vogue took him on regularly in 1927. He set up his own studio, and one of his earliest clients and, later, best friends was Stephen Tennant.  Beaton's photographs of Tennant and his circle are considered some of the best representations of the Bright Young People of the twenties and thirties.

Beaton's first camera was a Kodak 3A folding camera. Over the course of his career, he employed both large format cameras, and smaller Rolleiflex cameras. Beaton was never known as a highly skilled technical photographer, and instead focused on staging a compelling model or scene and looking for the perfect shutter-release moment.

He was a photographer for the British edition of Vogue in 1931 when George Hoyningen-Huene, photographer for the French Vogue travelled to England with his new friend Horst. Horst himself would begin to work for French Vogue in November of that year. The exchange and cross pollination of ideas between this collegial circle of artists across the Channel and the Atlantic gave rise to the look of style and sophistication for which the 1930s are known.

Beaton is known for his fashion photographs and society portraits. He worked as a staff photographer for Vanity Fair and Vogue in addition to photographing celebrities in Hollywood. In 1938, he inserted some tiny-but-still-legible anti-Semitic phrases (including the word "kike") into American Vogue at the side of an illustration about New York society. The issue was recalled and reprinted, and Beaton was fired.

Beaton returned to England, where the Queen recommended him to the Ministry of Information (MoI). He became a leading war photographer, best known for his images of the damage done by the German Blitz.  His style sharpened and his range broadened, Beaton's career was restored by the war.

Beaton often photographed the Royal Family for official publication. Queen Elizabeth The Queen Mother was his favourite royal sitter, and he once pocketed her scented hankie as a keepsake from a highly successful shoot. Beaton took the famous wedding pictures of the Duke and Duchess of Windsor (wearing an haute couture ensemble by the noted American fashion designer Mainbocher). He photographed Princess Margaret in a cream Dior dress for her 21st birthday in 1951, which became one of the most iconic royal portraits of the 20th century.

During the Second World War, Beaton was first posted to the Ministry of Information and given the task of recording images from the home front. During this assignment he captured one of the most enduring images of British suffering during the war, that of 3-year-old Blitz victim Eileen Dunne recovering in hospital, clutching her beloved teddy bear. When the image was published, America had not yet officially joined the war, but images such as Beaton's helped push the Americans to put pressure on their government to help Britain in its hour of need.

Beaton had a major influence on and relationship with Angus McBean and David Bailey. McBean was a well-known portrait photographer of his era.  Later in his career, his work is influenced by Beaton.  Bailey was influenced by Beaton when they met while working for British Vogue in the early 1960s. Bailey's use of square format (6x6) images is similar to Beaton's own working patterns.

Stage and film design

After the war, Beaton tackled the Broadway stage, designing sets, costumes, and lighting for a 1946 revival of Lady Windermere's Fan, in which he also acted.

His costumes for Lerner and Loewe's My Fair Lady (1956) were highly praised.  This led to two Lerner and Loewe film musicals, Gigi (1958) and My Fair Lady (1964), each of which earned Beaton the Academy Award for Best Costume Design. He also designed the period costumes for the 1970 film On a Clear Day You Can See Forever.

His additional Broadway credits include The Grass Harp (1952), The Chalk Garden (1955), Saratoga (1959), Tenderloin (1960), and Coco (1969). He was the recipient of four Tony Awards.

He designed the sets and costumes for a production of Puccini's last opera Turandot, first used at the Metropolitan Opera in New York and then at Covent Garden.

Beaton designed the academic dress of the University of East Anglia.

Diaries
Cecil Beaton was a published and well-known diarist. In his lifetime, six volumes of diaries were published, spanning the years 1922–1974. Recently some unexpurgated material has been published.   "In the published diaries, opinions are softened, celebrated figures are hailed as wonders and triumphs, whereas in the originals, Cecil can be as venomous as anyone I have ever read or heard in the most shocking of conversation" wrote their editor, Hugo Vickers.

Last public interview
The last public interview given by Sir Cecil Beaton was in January 1980 for an edition of the BBC's radio programme Desert Island Discs. The interviewer was Roy Plomley. The recording was broadcast on Friday 1 February 1980 following the Beaton family's permission. Owing to Beaton's frailty, the interview was recorded at Beaton's 17th-century home of Reddish House in Broad Chalke in Wiltshire (near Salisbury).

Beaton, though frail, recalled events in his life, particularly from the 1930s and 1940s (the Blitz). Among the recollections were his associations with stars of Hollywood and British Royalty notably The Duke and Duchess of Windsor (whose official wedding photographs Beaton took on 3 June 1937 at relatively short notice); and official portraits of Queen Elizabeth (later Queen Elizabeth The Queen Mother) and Her Majesty The Queen on her Coronation day on 2 June 1953. The interview also alluded to a lifelong passion for performing arts and in particular ballet and operetta.

The Beaton programme is considered to be almost the final words on an era of "Bright Young Things" whose sunset had taken place by the time of the abdication of Edward VIII. Beaton commented specifically on Wallis Simpson (later titled The Duchess of Windsor after her marriage to the former King Edward VIII). The Duchess of Windsor was still alive at the time of the original Beaton interview and broadcast.

Beaton said that the one record that he would retain on the desert island should the others get washed away would be Beethoven's Symphony No 1, and his chosen book was a compendium of photographs he had taken down the years of "...people known and unknown; people known but now forgotten".

Personal life and death
Beaton had relationships with various men: his last lover was former Olympic fencer and teacher Kinmont Hoitsma. He also had relationships with women, including the actresses Greta Garbo and Coral Browne, the dancer Adele Astaire, the Greek socialite Madame Jean Ralli (Lilia), and the British socialite Doris Castlerosse (1900–42).

He was knighted in the 1972 New Year Honours.

Two years later, he suffered a stroke that left him permanently paralysed on the right side of his body. Although he learnt to write and draw with his left hand, and had cameras adapted, Beaton became frustrated by the limitations the stroke had put upon his work. As a result of his stroke, Beaton became anxious about financial security for his old age and, in 1976, entered into negotiations with Philippe Garner, expert-in-charge of photographs at Sotheby's.

On behalf of the auction house, Garner acquired Beaton's archive – excluding all portraits of the Royal Family, and the five decades of prints held by Vogue in London, Paris and New York. Garner, who had almost single-handedly invented the photographic auction, oversaw the archive's preservation and partial dispersal, so that Beaton's only tangible assets, and what he considered his life's work, would ensure him an annual income. The first of five auctions was held in 1977, the last in 1980.

By the end of the 1970s, Beaton's health had faded. He died on 18 January 1980 at Reddish House, his home in Broad Chalke, Wiltshire, four days after his 76th birthday.

Recognition

 Tony Award for Best Costume Design for Quadrille (1955)
 CBE (1956)
 Tony Award for Best Costume Design for My Fair Lady (1957)
 Fellow of the Ancient Monuments Society (1957)
 Academy Award for Best Costume Design for Gigi (1958)
 Tony Award for Best Costume Design for Saratoga (1960)
 Chevalier de la Légion d'Honneur (1960)
 Academy Award for Best Art Direction for My Fair Lady (1964)
 Academy Award for Best Costume Design for My Fair Lady (1964)
 Honorary Fellow of the Royal Photographic Society of Great Britain (1965)
 Tony Award for Best Costume Design for Coco 1970
 International Best Dressed List Hall of Fame, named 1970.
 Knighthood (1972)

Exhibitions

Major exhibitions have been held at the National Portrait Gallery in London in 1968 and in 2004.

The first international exhibition in thirty years, and first exhibition of his works to be held in Australia was held in Bendigo, Victoria from 10 December 2005 to 26 March 2006.

In October 2011, the BBC's Antiques Roadshow featured an oil portrait by Beaton of rock star Mick Jagger, whom Beaton met in the 1960s. The painting, originally sold at the Le Fevre Gallery in 1966, was valued for insurance purposes at £30,000.

The Museum of the City of New York dedicated an exhibition to Cecil Beaton from October 2011 to April 2012.

An exhibition celebrating The Queen's Diamond Jubilee and showing portraits of Her Majesty by Cecil Beaton, opened in October 2011 at the Laing Art Gallery, Newcastle-upon-Tyne.

Cecil Beaton: Theatre of War at the Imperial War Museum, London: major retrospective of Beaton's war photography, held from 6 September 2012 – 1 January 2013.

Cecil Beaton at Home: Ashcombe & Reddish at The Salisbury Museum, Wiltshire, from 23 May- 19 September 2014, a biographical retrospective focussing on Beaton's two Wiltshire houses, brought together for the first time many art works and possessions from both eras of Beaton's life.  The exhibition included a full-size reproduction of the murals and four-poster bed from the Circus Bedroom at Ashcombe, as well as a section of the drawing room at Reddish House.

In film and television
In the 1989 Australian film Darlings of the Gods, Beaton was portrayed by Shane Briant. In Netflix's 2016 series The Crown, Beaton was portrayed by Mark Tandy.

Publications

Selected works

 The Book of Beauty (Duckworth, 1930)
 Cecil Beaton's Scrapbook (Batsford, 1937)
 Cecil Beaton's New York (Batsford, 1938)
 My Royal Past (Batsford, 1939)
 History Under Fire with James Pope-Hennessy (Batsford, 1941)
 Time Exposure with Peter Quennell (Batsford, 1941)
 Air of Glory (HMSO, 1941)
 Winged Squadrons (Hutchinson, 1942)
 Near East (Batsford, 1943)
 British Photographers (William Collins, 1944)
 Far East (Batsford, 1945)
 Cecil Beaton's Indian Album (Batsford, 1945–6, republished as Indian Diary and Album, OUP, 1991)
 Cecil Beaton's Chinese Album (Batsford, 1945–6)
 India (Thacker & Co., 1945)
 Portrait of New York (Batsford, 1948)
 Ashcombe: The Story of a Fifteen-Year Lease (Batsford, 1949)
 Photobiography (Odhams, 1951)
 Ballet (Allan Wingate, 1951)
 Persona Grata with Kenneth Tynan (Allan Wingate, 1953)
 The Glass of Fashion (Weidenfeld & Nicolson, 1954)
 It Gives Me Great Pleasure (Weidenfeld & Nicolson, 1956)
 The Face of the World: An International Scrapbook of People and Places (Weidenfeld & Nicolson, 1957)
 Japanese (Weidenfeld & Nicolson, 1959)
 Quail in Aspic: The Life Story of Count Charles Korsetz (Weidenfeld & Nicolson, 1962)
 Images with a preface by Edith Sitwell and an introduction by Christopher Isherwood (Weidenfeld & Nicolson, 1963)
 Royal Portraits with an introduction by Peter Quennell (Weidenfeld & Nicolson, 1963)
 Cecil Beaton's 'Fair Lady''' (Weidenfeld & Nicolson, 1964)
 The Best of Beaton with an introduction by Truman Capote (Weidenfeld & Nicolson, 1968)
 My Bolivian Aunt: A Memoir (Weidenfeld & Nicolson, 1971)

Diaries
 Cecil Beaton's Diaries: 1922–39 The Wandering Years (Weidenfeld & Nicolson, 1961)
 Cecil Beaton's Diaries: 1939–44 The Years Between (Weidenfeld & Nicolson, 1965)
 Cecil Beaton's Diaries: 1944–48 The Happy Years (Weidenfeld & Nicolson, 1972)
 Cecil Beaton's Diaries: 1948–55 The Strenuous Years (Weidenfeld & Nicolson, 1973)
 Cecil Beaton's Diaries: 1955–63 The Restless Years (Weidenfeld & Nicolson, 1976)
 Cecil Beaton's Diaries: 1963–74 The Parting Years (Weidenfeld & Nicolson, 1978)
 Self Portrait with Friends: The Selected Diaries of Cecil Beaton 1926–1974 edited by Richard Buckle (Weidenfeld & Nicolson, 1979)
 The Unexpurgated Beaton: The Cecil Beaton Diaries as they were written with an introduction by Hugo Vickers (Orion, 2003)
 Beaton in the Sixties: More Unexpurgated Diaries with an introduction by Hugo Vickers (Weidenfeld & Nicolson, 2004)

Photographs

 Sir William Walton, 1926
 Stephen Tennant, 1927
 Lady Diana Cooper, 1928
 Charles James (designer), 1929
 Lillian Gish, 1929
 Oliver Messel, 1929
 Lord David Cecil, 1930
 Lady Georgia Sitwell, 1930
 Gary Cooper, 1931
 Molly Fink, 1926
 Pablo Picasso, 1933
 Helen Hope Montgomery Scott, 1933
 Dürrüşehvar Sultan, 1933
 Marlene Dietrich, 1935
 Salvador Dalí, 1936
 Natalie Paley, 1936
 Aldous Huxley, 1936
 Daisy Fellowes, 1937
 Helen of Greece and Denmark, Queen Mother of Romania, 1937
 Lady Ursula Manners, 1937
 Queen Sita Devi of Kapurthala, 1940
 Bomb Victim (Eileen Dunne), 1940
 Winston Churchill, 1940
 Graham Sutherland, 1940
 Charles de Gaulle, 1941
 Walter Sickert, 1942
 Maharani Gayatri Devi, Rajmata of Jaipur, 1943
 John Pope-Hennessy, 1945
 Isabel Jeans, 1945
 Greta Garbo, 1946
 Yul Brynner, 1946Princess Fawzia Fuad of Egypt, Queen of Iran Vivien Leigh, 1947
 Marlon Brando, 1947
 Truman Capote, 1948–1949
 Bobby Henrey, 1948
 Countess Cristiana Brandolini d'Adda, 1951
 Duchess of Windsor, 1951
 Vita Sackville-West, 1952
 C. Z. Guest, 1952
 Graham Greene, 1953
 Elizabeth II's Coronation, 1953
 Alexis von Rosenberg, Baron de Redé, 1953
 Elizabeth Taylor, 1954
 Grace Kelly, 1954
 Mona von Bismarck, 1955
 Bernard Berenson, 1955
 Joan Crawford, 1956
 Mrs. Charles (Jayne Wrightsman), 1956
 Maria Callas, 1956
 Dame Edith Sitwell, 1956
 Colin Wilson, 1956
 Marilyn Monroe, 1956
 Leslie Caron, 1957
 Dolores Guinness, 1958
 Princess Margaret, Countess of Snowdon, 1960
 Albert Finney, 1961
 Cristóbal Balenciaga, 1962
 Lee Radziwill, 1962
 Karen Blixen, 1962
 Rudolf Nureyev, 1963
 Audrey Hepburn, 1964
 Margot Fonteyn, 1965
 Jacqueline Kennedy, 1965
 Sheridan Hamilton-Temple-Blackwood, 5th Marquess of Dufferin and Ava, 1965
 Jamie Wyeth, 1966
 Georgia O'Keeffe, 1966
 Andy Warhol, 1967
 Twiggy, 1967
 Mick Jagger, 1968
 Katharine Hepburn, 1969
 Barbra Streisand, 1969
 Gloria Guinness, 1970
 Hubert de Givenchy, 1970
 Mae West, 1970
 David Hockney, 1970
 Jane Birkin, 1971
 Marie-Hélène de Rothschild, 1971
 Marisa Berenson as Luisa Casati, 1971
 Jacqueline de Ribes, 1971
 Pauline de Rothschild, 1972
 Tina Chow, 1973
 Gilbert & George, 1974
 Inès de La Fressange, 1978
 Paloma Picasso, 1978
 Caroline of Monaco, 1978
 Olimpia de Rothschild, 1978
 Dayle Haddon, 1979

References

Further reading 
 Beaton, Cecil Sir & Boddington, Jennie, 1922– & National Gallery of Victoria (1975). Cecil Beaton's camera. National Gallery of Victoria, Melbourne

External links

 
 
 
 
 
 Theatre Archive University of Bristol
 
 Cecil Beaton textile designs designed in 1948 for Zika Ascher
 Cecil Beaton interview on BBC Radio 4 Desert Island Discs, 1 February 1980

Archival resources
 Papers of Sir Cecil Beaton (1922–1980, 38 archival boxes) at St John's College, Cambridge 
 Cecil Beaton Papers (1938–1979, 1 archival box) at Princeton University Library
 Cecil Beaton Studio Archive at Sotheby's Picture Library
 W.H. Crain Costume and Scene Design Collection at the Harry Ransom Center

1904 births
1980 deaths

20th-century diarists
20th-century English LGBT people
Alumni of St John's College, Cambridge
Beaton family
Best Art Direction Academy Award winners
Best Costume Design Academy Award winners
Bisexual painters
Bisexual men
British portrait photographers
Broadway set designers
Burials in Wiltshire
Chevaliers of the Légion d'honneur
Civil servants in the Ministry of Information (United Kingdom)
Commanders of the Order of the British Empire
Donaldson Award winners
English costume designers
English diarists
English interior designers
English scenic designers
English socialites
Fashion illustrators
Fashion photographers
Knights Bachelor
LGBT fashion designers
English LGBT painters
British LGBT photographers
Opera designers
People associated with the University of East Anglia
People educated at Harrow School
People educated at Heath Mount School
People educated at St Cyprian's School
Photographers from London
Photography in India
Photography in Japan
Theatrical photographers
Tony Award winners
War photographers